The Steens Mountain Wilderness is a wilderness area surrounding a portion of Steens Mountain of southeastern Oregon in the United States.  The reserve falls within the Steens Mountain Cooperative Management and Protection Area (CMPA). Both the reserve and the CMPA are administered by the Bureau of Land Management.  The wilderness area encompasses  of the CMPA's total .   of the Wilderness are protected from grazing and free of cattle.

Topography
The reserve features a variety of vegetative zones, from the arid sagebrush zone in the Alvord Desert, through the western juniper, mountain mahogany, mountain big sagebrush, quaking aspen, subalpine meadow, and subalpine grassland, to the snow cover zone.

Steens Mountain is the largest fault-block mountain in North America.  Pressure under the Earth's surface thrust the block upward approximately 20 million years ago, resulting in a steep eastern face with a more gentle slope on the western side of the mountain.  During the Ice Age, glaciers carved several deep gorges into the peak and created depressions where Lily, Fish, and Wildhorse lakes now stand.

Flora
Vegetation in the Steens Mountain Wilderness varies greatly according to elevation.  Common plants include sagebrush, juniper, various species of bunchgrass, mountain mahogany, aspen, mountain meadow knotweed, and false hellebore.  Other vegetation endemic to Steens Mountain includes Steens paintbrush (Castilleja pilosa var. steenensis), moss gentian (Gentiana fremontii), Steens Mountain penstemon (Penstemon davidsonii var. praeteritus), Steens Mountain thistle (Cirsium peckii), a dwarf blue lupine, and Cusick's buckwheat (Eriogonum cusickii).

Fauna

Steens Mountain is home to a variety of wildlife, including bighorn sheep, Rocky Mountain elk, mule deer, pronghorn, sage grouse, and the Great Basin redband trout. Cattle can be found in the wilderness as well, though they are excluded from grazing  on top of Steens Mountain. Coyote are also known to the area.

See also 
 Donner und Blitzen River
 List of Oregon Wildernesses
 List of U.S. Wilderness Areas
 Whorehouse Meadow
 Wilderness Act

References

External links
 
 
 
 
 
 
 Steens Mountain Wilderness Area - BLM page

Wilderness areas of Oregon
Bureau of Land Management wilderness areas in Oregon
Protected areas of Harney County, Oregon
2000 establishments in Oregon
Protected areas established in 2000